Hammad Nawaz Khan is a Pakistani politician who was a Member of the Provincial Assembly of the Punjab, from May 2013 to May 2018.

Early life and education
He was born on 6 August 1964 in Muzaffargarh.

He has received Intermediate level education.

Political career
He was elected to the Provincial Assembly of the Punjab as a candidate of Pakistan Muslim League (Nawaz) from Constituency PP-254 (Muzaffargarh-IV) in 2013 Pakistani general election.

References

Living people
Punjab MPAs 2013–2018
1964 births
Pakistan Muslim League (N) politicians
People from Muzaffargarh
People from Muzaffargarh District
Politicians from Muzaffargarh